Chavannes-sur-Suran is a former commune in the Ain department in eastern France. On 1 January 2017, it was merged into the new commune Nivigne et Suran.

Population

See also
Communes of the Ain department

References
 Official webpage of Chavannes-sur-Suran

Former communes of Ain
Ain communes articles needing translation from French Wikipedia
Populated places disestablished in 2017